Field hockey was introduced at the Olympic Games as a men's competition at the 1908 Games in London, with six teams, four from the United Kingdom of Great Britain and Ireland and other two were France and Germany.

History
Field hockey was removed from the Summer Olympic Games at the 1924 Paris Games because of the lack of an international sporting structure. The International Hockey Federation (FIH, Fédération Internationale de Hockey) was founded in Paris that year as a response to field hockey's omission. Men's field hockey became a permanent feature at the next Olympic Games, the 1928 Games in Amsterdam.

For a long time, India dominated the Olympics, winning the men's gold medal in seven out of eight Olympics from 1928 to 1964.  Later, Pakistan was also dominant, winning three gold and three silver medals between 1956 and 1984. India lost their dominance after the 1980s and Pakistan after the 1990s. India won their last gold medal in 1980 and Pakistan in 1984 Games. However India again won bronze medal in 2020 games after a long time.

Since 1968, various teams from around the world have seen gold-medal success at the Olympics. Since 1968, several countries in the Southern Hemisphere have won various medals in men's and women's field hockey, including Australia, New Zealand, Argentina, and Zimbabwe. A leading group of teams from the Northern Hemisphere has come from the Netherlands and from Germany.

Spain has appeared in the most Olympic men's competitions without winning the men's gold medal, having won silver three times in 1980, 1996, 2008 and bronze once in 1960. Australia had competed in 12 Olympics without winning gold before breaking their streak in 2004.

The first women's Olympic field hockey competition was introduced by the IOC at the 1980 Summer Olympics. Olympic field hockey games were first played on artificial turf at the 1976 Montreal Olympic Games.

Until the 1988 Olympics the tournament was invitational but FIH introduced a qualification system since the 1992 games.
India is the leading team in overall medal tally with 12 medals (8 gold, 1 silver and 3 bronze). India also lead in most number of gold medals.

Men

Results

Top four statistics

* = host nation

Team appearances
# = states or teams that have since split into two or more independent nations

45 teams have competed in at least one Olympic Games.

Debut of teams

Women

Results

Top four statistics

* = host nation

Team appearances

# = states that have since split into two or more independent nations

Australia and the Netherlands are the only teams to have competed at almost every Olympic Games, except for only one edition; 21 teams have competed in at least one Olympic Games.

Debut of teams

* = Defunct Team
# = Germany is official successor of West Germany

Medal table

Sources:

Total

Men

Women

See also
List of Olympic venues in field hockey

Notes

References

 
Olympics
Sports at the Summer Olympics
Olympic Games